Kelleria bogongensis is a Victorian endemic species in the family Thymelaeaceae.

Description

Range 
The species is known only from the Bogong High Plains where it grows in alpine tussock grasslands. It is listed as Vulnerable in Australia and Critically Endangered in Victoria.

Taxonomy 
The species was formally included in Kelleria laxa, which is now a New Zealand endemic.

References 

Flora of Victoria (Australia)
Plants described in 2014
Thymelaeaceae